The 1950 United States Senate election in Washington was held on November 7, 1950. Incumbent Democratic U.S. Senator Warren Magnuson won a second term in office, defeating Republican nominee W. Walter Williams.

Blanket primary
The blanket primary was held on September 12, 1950.

Candidates

Democratic
Warren G. Magnuson, incumbent United States Senator

Republican
W. Walter Williams, CEO of Continental Mortgage
Albert Franklyn Canwell, Member from the Washington House of Representatives' 5th District
Janet Tourtellotte, GOP committeewoman
George Kinnear
Carl Viking Holman

Results

General election

Candidates
 Warren Magnuson, Democratic, incumbent U.S. Senator
 W. Walter Williams, Republican, CEO of Continental Mortgage

Results

See also 
 1950 United States Senate elections

References 

1950
United States Senate
Washington